Hippolyte-Joseph Delaporte was an architect active in Morocco during the French Protectorate.

Biography 
In 1895, he was admitted to the École nationale supérieure des beaux-arts (ENSBA) and studied under Victor Laloux in his . He received his diploma in 1902. He was active in Versailles and, from 1913, in Casablanca.

Projects 

 Magasins Paris-Maroc, Place de France, 1913-14 (concrete engineering and execution Perret Frères).
 Hôtel Excelsior, Place de France, 1914-16 (reinforced concrete engineering by Coignet).
 Villa, Boulevard d'Anfa, 1917.
 Magasins Paris-Maroc Annex, 1920, Rue Chevandier de Valdrôme, 1920 (with Perret Frères).
 Temporary theater, Boulevard de Paris, 1922.
 Architect's villa, Rue du Parc, ca. 1924.
 Robelin building, Boulevard d'Alsace, 1928.
 Villa du Garreau, corner of Avenue Mers-Sultan and Rue du Languedoc, 1929.
 Lebascle mansion, Boulevard Gouraud, 1929.
 Ferrieu house, 10, Rue du Parc, 1932.
 Fouronge house, 5 Rue Defly Dieudé, 1932.
 Cannestraro building, corner of Boulevard des Régiments coloniaux and Rue des Colonies, 1932.
 Maret building, 128 Boulevard de la Gare, 1932.
 Oil and soap factories, Route de Rabat, 1937.
 Villa Merlin, Rue des Aviateurs, 1937.
 Villa Louradour, Val Fleuri, 1952.

References 

20th-century French architects
Casablanca
1874 births
1962 deaths
École des Beaux-Arts alumni
French expatriates in Morocco